Fawcus is a surname. Notable people with the surname include:

 Dan Fawcus (1858 – 1925), English professional football player and administrator
 Ernest Fawcus (1895 – 1966), English cricketer
 Leslie Fawcus (1898 – 1967), English school teacher, soldier and amateur cricketer 
 Peter Fawcus (1915 – 2003), British colonial administrator
 William Fawcus (born 1850), British rower